Cola lizae is a species of flowering plant in the family Malvaceae. It is found only in Gabon. It is threatened by habitat loss.

This species was first described in 1987 and named after Liz Williamson, a researcher at Lopé.

References

lizae
Endemic flora of Gabon
Near threatened plants
Vulnerable flora of Africa
Taxonomy articles created by Polbot
Plants described in 1987